Pedro Mejia (born June 23, 1970) is an American Democratic Party politician. A resident of Secaucus, he has represented the 32nd Legislative District in the New Jersey Assembly since 2018.

Elective office
Mejia was sworn into office on April 12, 2018, succeeding Vincent Prieto, who left office to take a position with the New Jersey Sports and Exposition Authority. Mejia became the first Dominican-American to serve in the New Jersey Legislature. Mejia served on an interim basis until winning the special election to serve the remainder of Prieto's term in  a special election on November 6, 2018, Mejia ran unopposed in the special election.

Committees 
Committee assignments for the current session are:
Regulated Professions, Vice-Chair
Consumer Affairs

District 32 
Each of the 40 districts in the New Jersey Legislature has one representative in the New Jersey Senate and two members in the New Jersey General Assembly.Each of the 40 districts in the New Jersey Legislature has one representative in the New Jersey Senate and two members in the New Jersey General Assembly. Representatives from the 32nd District for the 2022—2023 Legislative Session are:
Senator Nicholas Sacco
Assemblyman Pedro Mejia
Assemblywoman Angelica M. Jimenez

References

External links
Legislative webpage

1970 births
Living people
Hispanic and Latino American state legislators in New Jersey
Democratic Party members of the New Jersey General Assembly
21st-century American politicians
People from Secaucus, New Jersey
Politicians from Hudson County, New Jersey
American politicians of Dominican Republic descent
Dominican Republic emigrants to the United States